Boomerang! is a monthly audio magazine for children. The magazine is based in San Francisco, California.

History and profile
Boomerang! was founded by David Strohm in San Francisco in 1990. He continues to head-up the audio magazine's content development and day-to-day operations. The magazine targets children aged 6–12. It was an advertisement-free magazine during the 1990s.

Awards
Boomerang! received the American Library Association's Notable Recording Award, the Parent's Choice Award and the Educational Press Association Award for excellence in news reporting and was included in Dr. Toy's 100 Best Children's Products.

References

External resources
Boomerang! Web site
WorldCat record

Children's magazines published in the United States
Monthly magazines published in the United States
Audio periodicals
Education magazines
Magazines established in 1990
Advertising-free magazines
Magazines published in San Francisco